Elymnias dara is a butterfly in the family Nymphalidae. It was described by William Burgess Pryer and William Lucas Distant in 1887. It is found in the Indomalayan realm.

Subspecies
E. d. dara (Borneo)
E. d. albofasciata Staudinger, 1889 (Palawan)
E. d. deminuta Staudinger, 1889 (East Java, Bali)
E. d. bengena Fruhstorfer, 1907 (West Java)
E. d. darina Fruhstorfer, 1907 (Sumatra, Peninsular Malaysia)
E. d. daedalion (de Nicéville, 1890) (Burma: Tenasserim, Thailand)

References

External links
"Elymnias Hübner, 1818" at Markku Savela's Lepidoptera and Some Other Life Forms

Elymnias
Butterflies described in 1887